Leek Aleer ; born 21 August 2004) is a professional Australian Rules Footballer. He was selected by the Greater Western Sydney Giants in the 2021 AFL draft. He previously played for the Central Districts Football Club in the SANFL and the Angle Vale Football Club in the Adelaide Plains Football League.

Aleer was born in Kenya to Sudanese parents and came to Australia as a refugee when he was six years old. After arriving, his uncles were big fans of the Adelaide Crows and encouraged him to pursue the game.

Despite injury setbacks, Aleer broke the all-time record for the running vertical jump at the South Australian Draft Combine.

AFL career

Aleer made his AFL debut for the Giants in round 20 of the 2022 AFL season, against the Swans.

References

Living people
2004 births
Greater Western Sydney Giants players
Australian people of South Sudanese descent
Sportspeople of South Sudanese descent